Eumerus funeralis or lesser bulb fly is a species of Hoverfly, from the family Syrphidae, in the order Diptera. E. funeralis appears in Peck (1988) as a synonym of E. strigatus (Fallen), but was reinstated as the correct name for tuberculatus Rondani, sensu auctorum by Speight et al. (1998).

Description
External images
For terms, see: Morphology of Diptera.

Wing length: . 
Stigma are dark brown blackish. Femur 3 has a small ventral process  at the base and apical to this projection a bare, shiny area. Female has frons with a large and squarish shiny area occupying its entire width except for the narrow white dust strips against the eye. Tergites are blackish, no red-brown markings. Van Veen, M. (2004) figures the male genitalia. The larva is illustrated by Rotheray (1993)

Distribution
Originated in the Mediterranean basin, but becoming
cosmopolitan, especially in  the Palaearctic and Nearctic.

Biology
The habitat is open ground, dry grassland and clearings in dry woodland. Occurs also in suburban gardens and land used for horticulture. Flowers visited include Euphorbia, Fragaria, Leucanthemum, Ranunculus. The flight period is  April to September, with
peaks in June and August. The larva is phytophagous, feeding in damaged bulbs. Minor pest of Amaryllis, Hyacinthus and Narcissus.

References

Diptera of Europe
Eristalinae
Eumerini
Insects described in 1822